Grundmann Studios (1893–1917) in Boston, Massachusetts, was a building on Clarendon Street in the Back Bay. It contained artist's workspaces and multipurpose function rooms Copley Hall and Allston Hall. Prior to 1893, it functioned as a skating rink; after the Boston Art Students' Association leased the building it was renamed in honor of local art educator Emil Otto Grundmann. The Massachusetts Institute of Technology, whose campus was adjacent, owned the property. Tenants included the Copley Society (formerly Boston Art Students' Association); artists Henry R. Blaney, Herman Dudley Murphy, Frank Richmond, Mary Bradish Titcomb; sculptor John A. Wilson, architect Josephine Wright Chapman; and the College Club.

Ralph Adams Cram, architect and member of BASA, was charged with remodeling the interior. The first floor included club roomslibrary, parlor, smoking room and life class roomand two large halls, each lit with "an immense skylight or glass roof". The larger room, Copley Hall, could seat up to eight hundred people and was used for lectures, concerts, dancing parties and art exhibitions. The smaller Allston Hall was designed for use as a picture gallery or supper room. It was connected by dumbwaiter to the basement kitchen. The second floor contained thirty-four suites of one, two, or three rooms, described as "so delightfully picturesque, with little, overhanging galleries, which are reached by the tiniest flight of stairs, it seems like climbing into a doll's house.".

The building was demolished in 1917 to allow for the extension of Stuart St., part of the "broad highway" civic improvement project.

Events in Copley Hall

1890s
 Artists Festival, 1894
 Art exhibition to benefit Boston Art Students' Association
 American Arts and Crafts Exhibition
 Daughters of the Revolution of the Commonwealth of Massachusetts exhibit
 Artists' Festival, 1898
 John Singer Sargent exhibit

1900s
 Artists Festival, 1900
 Boston Orchestral Club concert
 Museum of Fine Arts, School of Drawing and Painting, 25th annual exhibit
 James Abbott McNeill Whistler exhibit
 Monet exhibition
 Artists' Festival, 1907
 Bela Pratt exhibit
 Yamanaka & Company Exhibition and auction of Japanese and Chinese fine art, November 6-8, 1902.

1910s
 Spanish art exhibit
 International Exhibition of Modern Art
 Portrait exhibit
 Bertha A. Grover exhibit
 "Farewell" exhibition (1917)

Images

Notes

References

Demolished buildings and structures in Boston
1893 establishments in Massachusetts
1917 disestablishments in the United States
Cultural history of Boston
20th century in Boston
Back Bay, Boston
Buildings and structures demolished in 1917